Canadian Society for Clinical Investigation (CSCI) was founded in 1951. The original purpose was to provide people with a forum to exchange scientific information. CSCI's current Mission is "To promote clinical and basic research in the field of human health throughout Canada, to lobby for adequate research funding at the federal, regional and local levels, and to support Canadian researchers in their endeavours and at all stages of their careers."

CSCI's Executive and Council is currently made up of the following individuals:
 President: Dr. Brent Winston
 Secretary Treasurer: Dr. Bing Siang
 Editor of CIM: Dr. Jonathan Angel

All medical schools in Canada are represented on the Council:
	
 Memorial University
 Dalhousie University
 McGill University
 University of Ottawa
 University of Toronto
 University of Western Ontario
 University of Manitoba
 University of Saskatchewan
 University of Calgary
 University of British Columbia
 Université de Montreal
 McMaster University
 Queen's University
 Sherbrooke University
 Université Laval

The Canadian Society for Clinical Investigation funds many awards:
 The CSCI_CIHR Resident Research Awards
 The Joe Doupe Young Investigator Award
 The Dr. Mel Silverman CSCI Distinguished Service Award
 The Distinguished Scientist Lecture and Award
 The Henry Friesen Award and Lecture (CSCI/RCPSC)

CSCI's Annual Meeting is held every year in September. The meeting is held jointly with CSCI, CITAC and FCIHR.

CSCI also publishes an electronic journal "Clinical and Investigative Medicine".

Anyone interested or actively involved in clinical investigation in Canada may join the CSCI as a member.

External links 
 Csci-scrc.ca
 cimonline.ca

Medical associations based in Canada
Canadian medical research
Organizations established in 1951
1951 establishments in Canada